Bourns may refer to:

 Arthur Bourns (1919–2015), chemistry professor and university administrator
 Frank Swift Bourns (1866–1935), ornithologist and doctor
 Bourns College of Engineering, Riverside, California, U.S.
 Bourns, Inc., American electronics corporation